(R,R)-Tetrahydrochrysene ((R,R)-THC) is a drug used to study the estrogen receptors (ERs) in scientific research. It is an ERβ antagonist and an ERα agonist with 10-fold higher affinity for ERβ relative to ERα. (R,R)-THC is a silent antagonist of ERβ, and, uniquely relative to other known ERβ antagonists, a passive antagonist of the receptor.

(S,S)-Tetrahydrochrysene ((S,S)-THC) also binds to the ERs, but in contrast to (R,R)-THC, (S,S)-THC is an agonist of both ERα and ERβ and has 20-fold lower affinity for ERβ relative to (R,R)-THC.

See also
 Propylpyrazoletriol (PPT)
 PHTPP
 Methylpiperidinopyrazole (MPP)
 Diarylpropionitrile (DPN)
 Prinaberel (ERB-041)
 Liquiritigenin
 Menerba
 2,8-DHHHC
 Chrysene

References

Estrogens
Antiestrogens